Štefan Sádovský (13 October 1928 – 17 June 1984) was the prime minister of the Slovak Socialist Republic from 2 January 1969 to 5 May 1969.

See also
Prime Minister of Slovakia

References 

1928 births
1984 deaths
Prime Ministers of Slovakia